Grignols is the name of several communes in France:

 Grignols, Dordogne, in the Dordogne department
 Grignols, Gironde, in the Gironde department